Ernest "Ernie" Coleman (4 January 1908 – 20 January 1984) was an English footballer.

Career
Born in Blidworth, Nottinghamshire, Coleman started his career as a youth playing for Hucknall. After being turned down by Nottingham Forest he joined Halifax Town of the Third Division North in 1927. He scored five times in nineteen appearances, enough to catch the attention of Grimsby Town of the Second Division, joining them in March 1928. In just eight appearances in the 1928-29 season he scored seven times, helping Grimsby reach the First Division. Coleman remained at Grimsby for the next three seasons, and was Grimsby's top scorer in 1930-31 and 1931-32, and in March 1932 was signed by Herbert Chapman for £7,500 to join the reigning league champions, Arsenal; he made 85 league appearances for Grimsby, scoring 57 goals.

Intended as a replacement for Jack Lambert, Coleman made his Arsenal debut in a 2–1 win against Leicester City at Highbury on 5 March 1932 and played a total of six games that season, as Arsenal finished runners-up to Everton. In his first full season at the club, 1932-33, Coleman scored 24 times in just 27 league games, including two hat-tricks as Arsenal reclaimed their title, earning Coleman a championship medal. However, his form dropped in 1933-34 and he only scored once in 12 league appearances, though he played as they won the 1933 FA Charity Shield. The signing of Ted Drake in March 1934 meant Coleman was forced out of the Arsenal team, and he signed for Middlesbrough in August 1934. In total he had played 47 games for Arsenal, scoring 26 goals.

Coleman spent three seasons with Middlesbrough, scoring 21 goals in 85 league appearances, before finishing his career with Norwich City. After the Second World War, he was manager of Linby Colliery he left Linby to manage Notts County and saved them from relegation from the Football League. He died in 1984, aged 76.

Footnotes

References

1908 births
1984 deaths
People from Blidworth
Footballers from Nottinghamshire
English footballers
Association football forwards
Halifax Town A.F.C. players
Grimsby Town F.C. players
Arsenal F.C. players
Middlesbrough F.C. players
Norwich City F.C. players
English football managers
Notts County F.C. managers